Samuel Clift (ca. 1610 - 1683) was an early English settler in the Province of Pennsylvania.

Background
Clift established the ferry service between Bristol in Pennsylvania and the New Jersey settlements. He built the King George II Inn in Bristol to service the ferry business. In 1682 he deeded his land and ferry to his son-in-law Joseph English, Jr.

He died in 1683.

References

Further reading

External links
History of Bucks County

1610 births
1683 deaths
People from Bristol, Pennsylvania